Tales from the Darkside is an album by German band Hypetraxx, released in 2000. The album peaked at No. 50 on the Swedish albums chart.

Track listing

Charts

Release history

References

External links

2000 albums